South Park Mall is a shopping mall located on the southwest side of San Antonio, Texas. It serves the communities on the south side of the city, with a Hispanic theme inside it. It is anchored by Dick's Sporting Goods, JCPenney, and  Macy's.

History
The mall opened in 1974. Roy L. Martin & Associates built the mall, which opened for business in 1974. Among the first tenants were J. C. Penney, TG&Y, Woolco, and H-E-B.

Woolco later became Mervyns, which closed in 2008. It became Dick's Sporting Goods in 2014. JCPenney is the other original anchor. Phar-Mor was added in 1991 as a third anchor, but it closed in 1992. In 1996, Sears moved from a store on Military Drive to the former Phar-Mor. Foley's (now Macy's) was added as a fourth anchor in 2000. On November 7, 2019, it was announced that Sears would be closing this location a part of a plan to close 96 stores nationwide. The store permanently closed on February 16, 2020.
In February 2020 A group of three New York-based investors teamed up to buy South Park Mall, JLL Capital Markets confirmed.

New York firms Mason Asset Management, Namdar Realty Group and CH Capital Group purchased the San Antonio

References

External links
South Park Mall official website
Jones Lang LaSalle website

Shopping malls in San Antonio
Namdar Realty Group
Shopping malls established in 1974
1974 establishments in Texas